NGC 2241 is an open cluster in the constellation Dorado. Located in the Large Magellanic Cloud, it was discovered by John Herschel on January 31, 1835.

References

External links 
 
 NED – NGC 2241
 SEDS – NGC 2241
 VizieR – NGC 2241

Open clusters
Dorado (constellation)
2241
Large Magellanic Cloud